Day Valley is a census-designated place (CDP) in Santa Cruz County, California, United States. The population was 3,409 at the 2010 census.

Geography
Day Valley is located at  (37.008820, -121.856544).

Demographics

2010
The 2010 United States Census reported that Day Valley had a population of 3,409. The racial makeup of Day Valley was 2,898 (85.0%) White, 20 (0.6%) African American, 23 (0.7%) Native American, 85 (2.5%) Asian, 4 (0.1%) Pacific Islander, 208 (6.1%) from other races, and 171 (5.0%) from two or more races. Hispanic or Latino of any race were 470 persons (13.8%).

The Census reported that 3,387 people (99.4% of the population) lived in households, 17 (0.5%) lived in non-institutionalized group quarters, and 5 (0.1%) were institutionalized.

There were 1,280 households, out of which 401 (31.3%) had children under the age of 18 living in them, 806 (63.0%) were opposite-sex married couples living together, 93 (7.3%) had a female householder with no husband present, 47 (3.7%) had a male householder with no wife present.  There were 73 (5.7%) unmarried opposite-sex partnerships, and 14 (1.1%) same-sex married couples or partnerships. 236 households (18.4%) were made up of individuals, and 93 (7.3%) had someone living alone who was 65 years of age or older. The average household size was 2.65.  There were 946 families (73.9% of all households); the average family size was 2.99.

The population was spread out, with 682 people (20.0%) under the age of 18, 261 people (7.7%) aged 18 to 24, 623 people (18.3%) aged 25 to 44, 1,285 people (37.7%) aged 45 to 64, and 558 people (16.4%) who were 65 years of age or older.  The median age was 48.0 years. For every 100 females, there were 101.0 males.  For every 100 females age 18 and over, there were 99.3 males.

The homeowner vacancy rate was 1.3%; the rental vacancy rate was 1.8%.  2,676 people (78.5% of the population) lived in owner-occupied housing units and 711 people (20.9%) lived in rental housing units.

2000
As of the census of 2000, there were 3,587 people, 1,283 households, and 946 families residing in the CDP. The racial makeup of the CDP was 86.37% White, 0.64% African American, 1.14% Native American, 1.67% Asian, 6.83% from other races, and 3.35% from two or more races. Hispanic or Latino of any race were 14.47% of the population.

There were 1,283 households, out of which 35.6% had children under the age of 18 living with them, 63.4% were married couples living together, 6.4% had a female householder with no husband present, and 26.2% were non-families. 18.6% of all households were made up of individuals, and 5.8% had someone living alone who was 65 years of age or older.  The average household size was 2.78 and the average family size was 3.15.

In the CDP, the population was spread out, with 25.5% under the age of 18, 6.3% from 18 to 24, 23.7% from 25 to 44, 33.5% from 45 to 64, and 11.0% who were 65 years of age or older.  The median age was 42 years. For every 100 females, there were 97.1 males.  For every 100 females age 18 and over, there were 96.8 males.

The median income for a household in the CDP was $72,438, and the median income for a family was $78,310. Males had a median income of $61,615 versus $43,854 for females. The per capita income for the CDP was $31,694.  About 2.0% of families and 5.4% of the population were below the poverty line, including 4.7% of those under age 18 and 3.9% of those age 65 or over.

Government

Local history
Many early settlers to Day Valley (including some members of the Day and Cox families) are buried in a small cemetery in the Forest and Meadows neighborhood, at the corner of Meadow Road and Downing Drive. Cox Road and Day Valley Road are named after these families.

References

External links

Census-designated places in Santa Cruz County, California
Census-designated places in California